Leilani Latu (born 5 February 1993) is a Tonga international rugby league footballer who played as a  most recently for the Warrington Wolves in the Super League. 

Latu has spent time on loan from Warrington at the Widnes Vikings in the Betfred Championship and has played for the Penrith Panthers and the Gold Coast Titans in the NRL. He has played at representative level for the Indigenous All Stars and NSW City.

Background
Latu was born in Sydney, New South Wales, Australia.

He is of Tongan, Italian and Torres Strait Islander descent. He spent his junior years playing for the Leichhardt Juniors when then he switched over to play in Lakemba for the St Johns Eagles. He played his junior rugby league for St. John Eagles, Lakemba, before being signed by the Canterbury-Bankstown Bulldogs.

Playing career

Early career
In 2011, Latu captained the Canterbury-Bankstown Bulldogs to the grand final of the S. G. Ball Cup, before moving into their National Youth Competition team, where he stayed until 2012. In 2013, he graduated to the Bulldogs' New South Wales Cup team.

In 2014, he joined the Penrith Panthers on a 2-year contract.

2015
On 3 May, Latu played for the New South Wales Residents against the Queensland Residents. In Round 21 of the 2015 NRL season, he made his NRL debut for the Panthers against the South Sydney Rabbitohs. On 14 September, he re-signed with the Panthers on a 2-year contract until the end of 2017. On 27 September, he was named at lock in the 2015 New South Wales Cup Team of the Year. On 9 October, Latu was named to make his international debut for Tonga in their 2017 World Cup qualifying match against the Cook Islands, though he was replaced by 18th man David Fifita in a late change.

2016
On 13 February, Latu played for the Indigenous All Stars against the World All Stars, playing off the interchange bench and scoring a try i his team's 8-12 loss at Suncorp Stadium. On 20 July, he extended his contract with the Panthers from the end of 2017 until the end of 2020.

2017
On 10 February 2017, Latu played for the Indigenous All Stars against the World All Stars in the 2017 All Stars match, coming off the interchange bench in the 34-8 win at Hunter Stadium. On 6 May 2017, Latu made his international debut for Tonga, scoring 2 tries in their 2017 Pacific Test against Fiji.

2018
Latu made his debut for the Gold Coast in round 1 of the 2018 NRL season against Canberra which ended in a 30-28 victory.  Latu made a total of 6 appearances for the Gold Coast as the club finished in 14th position on the table.

2019
Latu was limited to only three games for the Gold Coast in the 2019 NRL season as the club endured a horror year on and off the field which saw them finish last on the table.

2020
On 21 January, Latu signed a two-year deal to join English Super League side Warrington.

2021
On 10 Feb 2021 it was announced that Leilani was leaving Warrington by mutual consent

References

External links

Gold Coast Titans profile
Penrith Panthers profile
NRL profile

1993 births
Living people
Australian people of Italian descent
Australian sportspeople of Tongan descent
Australian rugby league players
Australian expatriate sportspeople in England
Gold Coast Titans players
Indigenous All Stars players
Indigenous Australian rugby league players
New South Wales City Origin rugby league team players
Penrith Panthers players
Rugby league players from Sydney
Rugby league props
Tonga national rugby league team players
Torres Strait Islands
Warrington Wolves players
Widnes Vikings players